Bellême is a commune in the Orne department in northwestern France. The musicologist Guillaume André Villoteau (1759–1839) was born in Bellême, as was Aristide Boucicaut (1810-1877), owner of Le Bon Marché, the world's first department store. This town is possibly the origin of the English and French surname Bellamy''.

Location
At the heart of the Parc Naturel Régional du Perche, in the Orne Department, Bellême is on a hill that dominates the Perche area.

Population

Heraldry

Sights
 Church of Saint-Sauveur 15th century, 16th century, rebuilt between 1675 and 1710.
 Crypt of the Saint-Santin Chapel, dating from the tenth century.
 Château gatehouse 15th century, and moat.
 Remains of the ramparts, bearing a plaque commemorating the capture of the château and the town by King Saint Louis and his mother, Blanche of Castile in 1229.
 17th century and eighteenth century houses.
 17th century Hôtel de ville.
 Sundials on rue du Château, place de la République and place Liègeard.

Landscape
 The town is built around the crest of a natural bowl, in which sits an outdoor lido (swimming pool), moto-cross circuit, stables and an expansive 18-hole golf course with adjacent hotel and holiday apartments.

Events
 Les Mycologiades internationales : Annual international wild mushroom festival.

International relations
Bellême is twinned with:
 Goring-on-Thames  since 1979.
 Stühlingen  since 1980.

Sports
 The town's football club, FC Pays Bellêmois, compete in the Ligue de Football Basse-Normandie and the Coupe de France, playing their home games at the town's Terrain Intercommunal.
 Moto Club Bellêmois hosts motocross events that welcome an international field of competitors.

See also
Communes of the Orne department
House of Bellême
Robert de Bellême
 Perche

References

External links

 Belleme Tourist Information (in French)
 Piscine à Bellême
 Moto Club Bellêmois
 Golf de Bellême
 FC Du Pays Bellêmois
 Goring and District Twinning Association
 Stuhlingen Web page (in German)

Communes of Orne
Perche